Taranis granata is a species of sea snail, a marine gastropod mollusk in the family Raphitomidae.

Description
The length of the shell attains 6.5 mm, its diameter 3 mm.

(Original description) The rather small shell is solid, ovate, and sharply gradate. Its colour is uniform buff. The shell contains seven whorls, inclusive of the protoconch. They are contracted at the suture, angled at the shoulder, rounded at the periphery, and hollowed at the base. 

Sculpture: The surface is reticulated by elevated flat-topped spirals and radials. On the upper whorls these are of equal value, and enclose deep square meshes. The radials amount on the body whorl to twenty-five, and on the antepenultimate to about twenty. They gradually diminish in size anteriorly and vanish on the base. On the body whorl there are about seventeen spirals, not counting a few minute interstitial threads.  On the penultimate whorl there are three and on earlier whorls two spirals. The protoconch consists of two rounded whorls, superficially smooth, but on high magnification developing faint and minute oblique reticulation. The aperture is imperfect in the only example seen.

Distribution
The holotype of this marine species was found off Queensland, Australia.

References

External links
 

granata
Gastropods described in 1922
Gastropods of Australia